Aubrey D. Davis (March 28, 1921 – November 23, 1996) was an American professional basketball player. He spent one season in the Basketball Association of America (BAA) with the St. Louis Bombers during the 1946–47 season. He attended Oklahoma Baptist University and East Central State Normal School.

BAA career statistics

Regular season

Playoffs

References

External links
 

1921 births
1996 deaths
Austin Pioneers players
Basketball players from Oklahoma
Dallas Rebels players
East Central Tigers men's basketball players
Forwards (basketball)
Guards (basketball)
Hammond Calumet Buccaneers players
Montgomery Rebels players
Muskogee Reds players
Oklahoma Baptist Bison baseball players
Oklahoma Baptist Bison basketball players
Oklahoma City Indians players
People from Caddo County, Oklahoma
St. Louis Bombers (NBA) players
Sunbury Mercuries players
Undrafted National Basketball Association players